Frederick Thomas Kelsall (4 May 1906 – 14 May 1931) was an English professional rugby league footballer who played in the 1920s and 1930s.

Background
Fred Kelsall was born in Great Sankey, Warrington, Lancashire, England, and he died aged 25 in Eccleston, St Helens, Lancashire, England.

Described as the heaviest and most skilled of the Widnes pack that won an unlikely victory at Wembley in 1930, Fred Kelsall died in a motorcycle accident (in which his pillion passenger Miss Minnie Salt and two persons on another motorcycle were also killed) in May 1931.

Playing career

International honours
Fred Kelsall won a cap for England while at Widnes in 1930 against Other Nationalities.

Challenge Cup Final appearances
Fred Kelsall played , in Widnes' 10-3 victory over St. Helens in the 1929–30 Challenge Cup Final during the 1929–30 season at Wembley Stadium, London on Saturday 3 May 1930 in front of a crowd of 36,544.

County Cup Final appearances
Fred Kelsall played left-, i.e. number 8, in Widnes' 4-5 defeat by Wigan in the 1928–29 Lancashire County Cup Final during the 1928–29 season at Wilderspool Stadium, Warrington on Saturday 24 November 1928.

References

External links
Statistics at rugby.widnes.tv

1906 births
1931 deaths
Cheshire rugby league team players
England national rugby league team players
English rugby league players
Lancashire rugby league team players
Road incident deaths in England
Rugby league players from Warrington
Rugby league props
Widnes Vikings players